Teen Bayka Fajiti Aika is a 2012 Indian Marathi-language comedy film directed by Raju Parsekar and produced by Shankar Mitkari. Film story is revolving around a husband troubled by three wives.

Plot 
Vishwasrao Dhoke, a married man for five years, so far without a single Descendant;  His mother taunts him every time he wants to have a son. One day, the family attends a wedding where the bride is left for dowry, for which the mother suggests her son marry the bride. After second wife Pari enters Vishwasrao's life and claims to be his third wife.

Cast 

 Makarand Anaspure as Vishwasrao Dhoke 
 Surekha Kudchi as Vishwasrao's Mother
 Nisha Parulekar as Prajakta 
 Kranti Redkar as Madhvi
 Tejasree Khele as Pari 

 Vijay Chavan as Vishwasrao's Father 
Mansi Naik Special appearance in "Baghtoy Rikshawala" song
Shrishti Marathe

Soundtrack

References

External links 
 
 Teen Bayka Fajiti Aika at Rotten Tomatoes

2012 films